This is a list of seasons played by Maccabi Petah Tikva Football Club in Israeli and European football, from 1928 (when the club joined the newly founded EIFA) to the most recent completed season. It details the club's achievements in major competitions, and the top scorers for each season. Top scorers in bold were also the top scorers in the Israeli league that season. Records of minor competitions such as the Lilian Cup are not included due to them being considered of less importance than the State Cup and the Toto Cup.

The club has won the State Cup twice and the Toto Cup (for top division clubs) four times The club has never been out of the two top divisions of Israeli football.

History
Maccabi Petah Tikva Football Club was established in 1912 by a group of students from Petah Tikva in Istanbul. In 1928 the club joined the EIFA and competed in its competitions ever since. The club played in the top division until the end of the 1965–65 season, when the club relegated to the second division for the first time in its existence. Although the club never won the top division, it finished as runners-up three times in its history.

Seasons

Key

 P = Played
 W = Games won
 D = Games drawn
 L = Games lost
 F = Goals for
 A = Goals against
 Pts = Points
 Pos = Final position

 Leumit = Liga Leumit (National League)
 Artzit = Liga Artzit (Nationwide League)
 Premier = Liga Al (Premier League)
 Pal. League = Palestine League

 F = Final
 Group = Group stage
 QF = Quarter-finals
 QR1 = First Qualifying Round
 QR2 = Second Qualifying Round
 QR3 = Third Qualifying Round
 QR4 = Fourth Qualifying Round
 RInt = Intermediate Round

 R1 = Round 1
 R2 = Round 2
 R3 = Round 3
 R4 = Round 4
 R5 = Round 5
 R6 = Round 6
 SF = Semi-finals

Notes

References
Seasons Hapoel-Haifa.com 

Maccabi Petah Tikva F.C.
 
Maccabi Petah Tikva